The 2019 Indian general election in Andaman and Nicobar Islands, held for 1 seat in the Island. Congress candidate Kuldeep Rai Sharma won the election from the only seat. Sharma defeated BJP candidate Vishal Jolly.

Details

References

Andaman
Elections in the Andaman and Nicobar Islands
2010s in the Andaman and Nicobar Islands